The Santa Fe Times is a newspaper in Santa Fe, New Mexico, United States.

References

External links
Official website

Newspapers published in New Mexico
Mass media in Santa Fe, New Mexico